Jill Marilynn Watson (born March 29, 1963 in Bloomington, Indiana) is an American retired pair skater and coach. With her partner Peter Oppegard, she is the 1988 Olympic bronze medalist and a three-time U.S. national champion.

Watson was initially paired with Burt Lancon, with whom she won two national bronze medals in 1983 and 1984. She began competing with Oppegard in 1985. In their career, Watson and Oppegard won three national titles, a world bronze medal, an Olympic bronze medal, and various other medals. During Watson and Oppegard's free skate at the 1988 Olympics, a photographer dropped his camera bag onto the ice and an usher walked onto the ice to pick it up while the pair was performing an overhead lift on the other side of the rink.

She is now a coach at AZ Ice in the United States.  She coached Rena Inoue/John Baldwin for five seasons.

Jill Watson and Peter Oppegard were inducted into the U.S. Figure Skating Hall of Fame in 2004.

Results

Pairs with Peter Oppegard

Pairs with Burt Lancon

References

External links
 Watson and Lancon competition results
 Watson and Oppegard competition results

1963 births
Living people
American female pair skaters
American figure skating coaches
Figure skaters at the 1988 Winter Olympics
Olympic bronze medalists for the United States in figure skating
Olympic medalists in figure skating
World Figure Skating Championships medalists
Sportspeople from Bloomington, Indiana
Female sports coaches
Medalists at the 1988 Winter Olympics
21st-century American women